Orrmaesia ancilla is a species of sea snail, a marine gastropod mollusk in the family Drilliidae.

Description

Distribution
This species occurs in the demersal zone of the Indian Ocean off the Agulhas Bank and the Eastern Cape, South Africa

References

 Thiele (1925) Gastropoden der Deutschen Tiefsee-Expedition. In:. Wissenschaftliche Ergebnisse der Deutschen Tiefsee-Expedition II. Teil, vol. 17, No. 2, Gutstav Fischer, Berlin
  Tucker, J.K. 2004 Catalog of recent and fossil turrids (Mollusca: Gastropoda). Zootaxa 682:1–1295

Endemic fauna of South Africa
ancilla
Gastropods described in 1925